Matt Helm is an American mystery television series which aired on ABC from September 20, 1975 to January 3, 1976. The title character was played by Anthony Franciosa.

Overview
The series was loosely based upon the literary character Matt Helm, who had been created and introduced by Donald Hamilton in his 1960 novel, Death of a Citizen; he had also been played by Dean Martin in a series of spy comedy films in the late 1960s. This series resembled neither the books—in which Helm was a terse assassin for a secret government agency—nor the films—in which Helm was a womanizing, wisecracking secret agent.

The series sees Matt Helm, a retired spy, opening a private detective business. Thus, most of the plot lines were standard detective stories of the day, such as one episode in which Helm investigates the disappearance of a race horse. Laraine Stephens co-starred as Claire Kronski, Helm's assistant.

A pilot TV movie aired on May 7, 1975, previewing the series already on the announced fall schedule and debuted on September 20 of the same year. Ratings were not strong enough for the series to continue past its initial 13 episodes, and the final episode aired on January 3, 1976.

Many notable guest stars appeared on the series during its short run, including Lynda Carter, who appeared in the penultimate episode, "Panic", playing a singer. Her appearance coincided with her rise to fame as Wonder Woman.

Other guests included: Jack Cassidy, Gretchen Corbett, Bert Convy, Pat Crowley, Susan Dey, Howard Duff, Shelley Fabares, Farley Granger, Sherry Jackson, L.Q. Jones, Patrick Macnee, Juliet Mills, Ian McShane, Ann Turkel and John Vernon.

To date, the Matt Helm TV series marks the most recent attempt to adapt Donald Hamilton's creation, although there were reports in 2006 that a film studio had optioned the rights to the character.

Cast
Anthony Franciosa .... Matt Helm 
Laraine Stephens .... Claire Kronski
Jeff Donnell .... Ethel
Gene Evans .... Sgt. Fred Hanrahan
Peter Brown .... Cassidy  (2 episodes)
Eileen Chesis .... Joan  (2 episodes)

Episodes

External links

 
 

American Broadcasting Company original programming
1975 American television series debuts
1976 American television series endings
1970s American drama television series
Helm, Matt
Television series by Sony Pictures Television
English-language television shows
Television shows set in California